Alestopetersius compressus is a species of African tetras found in the middle Congo River basin, in the Democratic Republic of the Congo.

References

Paugy, D., 1984. Characidae. p. 140-183. In J. Daget, J.-P. Gosse and D.F.E. Thys van den Audenaerde (eds.) Check-list of the freshwater fishes of Africa (CLOFFA). ORSTOM, Paris and MRAC, Tervuren. Vol. 1.

Alestidae
Fish of Africa
Taxa named by Max Poll
Taxa named by Jean-Pierre Gosse
Fish described in 1963